Churchland can refer to the following:

Places
 Churchlands, Western Australia
 Churchlands Senior High School
 Churchland, North Carolina
 Churchland, Virginia

Other
 Churchland High School, a public high school in Portsmouth, Virginia
 Churchland pear, a cultivar of the fruit
 Paul Churchland and Patricia Churchland, philosopher couple